Stefan Gryff (5 May 1938 - 3 June 2017) was a Polish-Australian actor. He specialised in playing Poles, Russians, Greeks and other Mediterranean types.

Gryff studied law at the University of Sydney and during his studies appeared in several plays and revues with the University dramatic societies. He practised as a criminal lawyer in Australia before leaving for London where he appeared in a number of stage plays before moving into television and films. He is best known for his role as  Captain Krasakis in the TV series The Lotus Eaters, its sequel Who Pays the Ferryman?, and also as Charolambous in The Aphrodite Inheritance.

His film appearances include Julia (1977), Reds (1981), White Nights (1985), Surviving Picasso (1996), Anna Karenina (1997) and The Saint (1997). He also appeared in episodes of the television series The Avengers, Beau Geste,  The Onedin Line, Poirot, Midnight Man and Holby City.

Before his death, he worked as a screen acting coach.

Filmography

References

External links

1938 births
2017 deaths
Australian male film actors
Male actors from Warsaw
Polish male film actors
Polish emigrants to Australia